A velopharyngeal fricative, also known as a posterior nasal fricative, is a sound produced by some children with speech disorders, including some with a cleft palate, as a substitute for sibilants, which cannot be produced with a cleft palate. It results from "the approximation but inadequate closure of the upper border of the velum and the posterior pharyngeal wall." To produce a velopharyngeal fricative, the soft palate approaches the pharyngeal wall and narrows the velopharyngeal port, such that the restricted port creates fricative turbulence in air forced through it into the nasal cavity. The articulation may be aided by a posterior positioning of the tongue and may involve velar flutter (a snorting sound).

The term 'velopharyngeal' indicates "articulation between the upper surface of the velum and the back wall of the naso-pharynx."

The following variants are described:

 A voiceless velopharyngeal fricative  
 A voiced velopharyngeal fricative  
 A velopharyngeal fricative trill or "snort" (much as epiglottal fricatives tend to be trilled):
voiceless  
voiced  
Other consonants accompanied by velopharyngeal frication, such as  = , potentially transcribed with an additional  to overtly indicate accompanying trill.

The letter for the trill was only adopted in 2015; before then the letter  stood for both. Some authorities describe the trilled velopharyngeals as being accompanied by uvular trill rather than velar flutter. Whether this is a difference in interpretation or of pronunciation, it would be explicitly transcribed with a superscript : voiceless  and voiced .

See also
Hypernasal speech

External links

References

Speech disorders
Fricative consonants
Nasal consonants